The Castle of Anguix (Spanish: Castillo de Anguix) is a castle located in Sayatón, Spain. It was declared Bien de Interés Cultural in 1992.

The Castle of Anguix is an example of castillo roquero architecture.  These type of structures were common in areas with steep terrain that needed a fortified outpost.  The castle was occupied during Austrian soldiers during the War of the Spanish Succession and was recaptured by Philip V's troops.

References 

Bien de Interés Cultural landmarks in the Province of Guadalajara
Castles in Castilla–La Mancha